The Hun Sen Cup was the main football knockout tournament in Cambodia. The 2016 Hun Sen Cup was the 10th season of the Hun Sen Cup, the premier knockout tournament for association football clubs in Cambodia involving Cambodian League and provincial teams organized by the Football Federation of Cambodia.

Preah Khan Reach Svay Rieng were the defending champions, having beaten Nagaworld 2–1 in the previous season's final.

Qualifying round
The 17 teams from provinces of six zones divided into six groups playing in Qualifying round. Each group was played on a home-and-away round-robin basis.

Group A

First leg

Second leg

Group B

First leg

Second leg

Group C

First leg

Second leg

Group D

First leg

Second leg

Group E

First leg

Second leg

Group F

First leg

Second leg

Group stage
The remaining 14 teams from Qualifying round with the 10 teams of Cambodian League 2015 from rank 1 to 10 (Build Bright United withdrew and replaced by Western Phnom Penh) entered the Group stage. Each group was played on a single round-robin basis at the pre-selected hosts. The teams finishing in the top two positions in each of the four groups (highlighted in tables) in group stage progressed to the quarter-finals.

Group A

Group B

Group C

Group D

Knockout stage

Quarter-finals

Semi-finals

Third place play-off

Final

Awards

 Top goal scorer (The Golden Boot): Suong Virak of Cambodian Tiger (25 goals)
 Goalkeeper of the Season (The Golden Glove): Um Sereyroth of National Defense Ministry
 Fair Play: Phnom Penh Crown

See also
 2016 Cambodian League
 Cambodian League
 Hun Sen Cup

References

Hun Sen Cup seasons
2016 in Cambodian football
2016 domestic association football cups